Vicksburg is an unincorporated community in Pemiscot County, in the U.S. state of Missouri.

History
A post office called Vicksburg was established in 1913, and remained in operation until 1917. The community was named after J. P. Vickery, a local schoolteacher.

References

Unincorporated communities in Pemiscot County, Missouri
Unincorporated communities in Missouri